The Bridge class was a series of six combination carrier vessels built by Swan Hunter at their shipyard on the River Tees between 1971 and 1976. The vessels were built by Seabridge for four different operators, hence their "Bridge" suffix names.

History
The Bridge class was designed in the late 1960s. All were built by Swan Hunter at their newly acquired shipyard at Haverton Hill on the River Tees. The first vessel, Furness Bridge, was launched in 1971. The vessels were built as a class by Seabridge, and were then operated by Bibby Line, Furness Withy, Hunting Line and Hilmar Reksten. Tyne Bridge followed in 1972, English Bridge (later Kowloon Bridge) in 1973, Sir John Hunter in 1974, Sir Alexander Glen in 1975 and finally Liverpool Bridge (later Derbyshire) in 1976.

Whilst in commercial service, two of the six Bridge-class vessels sank—Derbyshire in 1980 and Kowloon Bridge in 1986. Between 1982 and 1997, the remaining four vessels were scrapped, the longest surviving vessel being Kona (ex Sir John Hunter).

Vessels

Furness Bridge
MV Furness Bridge (1971) was the first vessel of the class and built for Furness Withy. Whilst in service the vessel carried a number of different names - Lake Arrowhead, Marcona Pathfinder, World Pathfinder and finally Ocean Sovereign. The vessel was scrapped in 1992. Furness Bridge was the only vessel of the class built to the original design.

Tyne Bridge
MV Tyne Bridge (est., 1972) was built for Hunting and Sons Ltd., of Newcastle-Upon-Tyne. The vessel suffered several major incidents during her lifespan, including an engine room fire in South America when almost new and a major explosion of number eight cargo hold in the Sea of Japan several years later. The latter followed the striking of an iceberg in the Strait of Belle Isle on a voyage from Immingham in the UK to Sept-Îles, Quebec in Canada, which caused severe damage to her bulbous bow, fore-peak and fore-deep tanks. Later renamed East Bridge before being scrapped in 1987.

English Bridge

MV English Bridge (1973) was built for Bibby Line. The vessel was renamed Worcestershire in 1977, and sold a year later. The vessel was renamed Sunshine, Murcurio, Crystal Transporter and finally Kowloon Bridge. In 1986, Kowloon Bridge lost its rudder in heavy weather conditions off West Cork, Ireland and later sank after breaking its back.

Sir John Hunter
MV Sir John Hunter (88,404 GT, 1974) was built for Hilmar Reksten. Renamed Nordic Challenger, Cast Kittiwake, Kona, El Caribe, Sam Hunt and Nafsika when in service. The vessel was scrapped in 1997.

Sir Alexander Glen
MV Sir Alexander Glen (89,423 GT, 1975) was also built for Hilmar Reksten. Renamed Ocean Monarch in 1989 and again renamed Ocean Mandarin before being scrapped in 1995.

Liverpool Bridge

MV Liverpool Bridge (1976) was the last vessel in the class and also the largest. It was also built for Bibby Line. It was badly damaged in an explosion and renamed Derbyshire in 1978 before being lost in Typhoon Orchid off of Japan in 1980 with the loss of all 44 crew members on board.

Ships built by Swan Hunter
Ships built on the River Tees
Ore-bulk-oil carriers